Hellenic State, also translated as Greek State, was used as the official name of the modern Greek state three times in its history:

First Hellenic Republic during the period of governance by Ioannis Kapodistrias in 1828–1832, when Greece was first constituted as a regular state after the Greek War of Independence.
 the first few months of the Second Hellenic Republic, after which the name was changed to Hellenic Republic on 24 May 1924.
Hellenic State (1941–1944), during the period of Axis occupation (1941–1944) of the country during World War II, when the collaborationist regime renamed the country in opposition to the internationally recognized Kingdom of Greece, which remained in exile in Egypt.

Political history of Greece